Busted is the debut studio album by English pop rock band Busted. It was released in the UK in September 2002 and peaked at #2 the following January after the success of second single "Year 3000", which reached #2 on the UK Singles Chart.

Background
The first single released from the album was "What I Go to School For", which reached #3. This was followed by "Year 3000", which reached #2, "You Said No" and "Sleeping with the Light On". "You Said No" peaked at #1 and "Sleeping with the Light On" peaked at #3. A European only single, "Hurra, hurra, die Schule brennt", was released on the same date as "You Said No" was released in the UK.

Busted was the 8th best-selling album of 2003 in the UK. The album has sold over 1.2 million copies and been certified as 4× Platinum in the UK. The album spent 77 weeks on the UK Top 75 Albums chart. Six tracks were co-written with John McLaughlin and Steve Robson. The other remaining songs were written by the band themselves. who often collaborate with each other. Both "What I Go to School For" and "Year 3000" were covered by the Jonas Brothers, and released on their 2006 album It's About Time.

On the cassette release of the album, "Losing You" is advertised as a single. However, the song never was released as a single, and it is unknown whether it was planned to be or if this was a mistake. In 2018, bassist Matt Willis said that they would never play the song live, stating 'We've never played that song. For a very good reason – we don't like it'.

Reception

AllMusic states: "[Busted] slide smoothly between... dull teen pop ballads with the sickeningly overwrought vocals typical of the genre... and relatively more creative stuff that punches up the formula with pop-ternative production and smirking, yet still squeaky clean lyrical witticisms. At best it's BBMak with better cheekbones; at worst, Busted is a neutered Sum 41". On bbc.co.uk, Jacqueline Hodges wrote: "Think a younger, British Wheatus or Blink-182 junior and you will be along the right lines. Their cheeky and geeky Green Day-type lyrics... are endearingly refreshing in these days of Gareth Gates and Ronan Keating mush". Q was more positive, Dan Stubbs writing: "Tales of copping off, time travel and a five-fingered fantasy about a schoolteacher with a nice bottom are delivered through inspired one-liners and clever gimmicks".

B-sides
Busted recorded a number of B-sides for their album campaign, including a number of classic covers, including cover versions of "Brown Eyed Girl", "Fun Fun Fun" and "Mrs Robinson", as well as new tracks including "Late Night Sauna", "My Good Friend" and "Last Summer", as well as the demo version of "Year 3000". The version of "Year 3000" which appears as the B-side to "Sleeping With The Light On" is the version which the band presented to Universal Music before they were signed by the label. "My Good Friend" has never been released on CD, and only appears on the cassette release of "You Said No", becoming one of the rarest Busted tracks around. The demo version of "Year 3000" was also only released on cassette, meaning it is also very rare and hard to find.

Track listing

 "You Said No" was originally titled "Crash and Burn" prior to the album's re-issue.

Personnel
James Bourne – guitars, vocals, keys, production
Charlie Simpson – guitars, vocals, drums
Matt Willis – bass, vocals
Steve Robson – production, synths

Charts and certifications

Weekly charts

Year-end charts

Certifications

References

Busted (band) albums
2002 debut albums
MCA Records albums
Albums produced by Steve Robson

it:Busted#Musica